General elections will be held in Guatemala on 25 June 2023 to elect the president and vice president, all 160 seats of the Congress, all 20 members of the Central American Parliament, and mayors and councils for all 340 municipalities in the country. Incumbent president Alejandro Giammattei is constitutionally prohibited from running for a second four-year term.

Background 
In July 2021, Attorney General, María Consuelo Porras, dismissed the head of the special prosecutor's office against impunity, Juan Francisco Sandoval. Sandoval left the country shortly afterwards to 'protect [his] life and integrity'. The Attorney General subsequently increased investigations on judges, lawyers and prosecutors linked to the fight against corruption; several former investigators of the Special Prosecutor's Office against Impunity (FECI) and the International Commission against Impunity in Guatemala (CICIG) were arrested in 2022 and others forced into exile or else continually harassed. Among the exiled judges are Miguel Ángel Gálvez (known for handling the La Línea corruption case) and Erika Aifan (awarded with the International Women of Courage Award in 2021).

In September 2021, the United States Department of State announced that it had added Porras to a list of "undemocratic and corrupt" officials. According to the US State Department, Porras "actively undermined" the corruption investigations conducted by Sandoval and his team.

At the end of July 2022, the police arrested journalist José Rubén Zamora, founder of the daily El Periódico, and searched the newspaper's headquarters, which had accused President Alejandro Giammattei and Attorney General Consuelo Porras of corruption. Some journalists also went into exile after the Public Ministry began investigations against them. During the trial of José Rubén Zamora in 2023, a judge asked to initiate an investigation against nine journalists.

In November 2022, Amnesty International declared Virginia Laparra a "prisoner of conscience". Laparra was one of the jailed anti-corruption prosecutors who was part of Juan Francisco Sandoval's team.

The United Nations and the European Union condemned the investigations of anti-corruption prosecutors in Guatemala and expressed that these procedures "weaken" the rule of law.

The International Federation for Human Rights, the World Organisation Against Torture and other NGOs warn in 2022 about the "strengthening of authoritarian rule" in Guatemala and declare that the country "experiencing an alarming phenomenon of capture and control of public institutions by economic and political elites".

The registration of candidates for the elections has also been clouded by criticism. The ticket of Movement for the Liberation of Peoples was not registered due to legal problems of the vice-presidential candidate Jordán Rodas; while Roberto Arzú's candidacy was revoked for allegedly carrying out "anticipated campaigning", Edmond Mulet was denounced by the Public Ministry for having spoken out against the investigation of the nine journalists during the Zamora trial. All three candidates are critical of Giammattei and according to electoral polls, they are among the first five positions.

Electoral system 
The President of Guatemala is elected using the two-round system.

Congress 
The 160 members of Congress are elected by two methods; 130 are elected from 22 multi-member constituencies based on the departments, with the remaining 31 elected from a single nationwide constituency. Seats are elected using closed list Proportional representation, with seats allocated using the D'Hondt method.

Presidential candidates

Declared

Rejected

Declined

Parties 
The following political parties did not run for a presidential ticket, but did run candidates for deputies and mayors.
 Guatemalan People's Party (PPG)
 National Advancement Party (PAN)

Individuals  
 Alfonso Alonso, Minister of Environment and Natural Resources (2018–2020) (National Convergence Front)  
 Marcos Antil, immigrant rights activist (Will, Opportunity and Solidarity)  
 Manuel Baldizón, member of Congress (2004–2008) (Change) (running for re-election)
 Neto Bran, Mayor of Mixco (2016–present) (Guatemalan People's Party) (running for re-election)
 Juan Carlos Eggenberger, businessman (Together) (running for Mayor of Guatemala City for National Advancement Party) 
 Javier Hernández, member of Congress (2016–present) (National Convergence Front) (running for re-election)
 Antonio Malouf, Minister of Economy (2020–2022) (Humanist Party of Guatemala/Citizen Prosperity)
 Jordán Rodas, Ombudsman (2017–2022) (Semilla–Winaq–URNG) (running for Vice President for Movement for the Liberation of Peoples)

Parliamentary parties

Opinion polls

See also
 List of elections in 2023

Notes

References

External links
Tribunal Supremo Electoral

2023 in Guatemala
Elections in Guatemala
Guatemala
Guatemala